E-readiness refers to a country's capacity and state of preparedness to participate in the electronic world. The state of maturity is commonly measured by the country's information and communications technology (ICT) infrastructure and the ability of its government and citizens to use the positive impacts of ICT for sustainable development.

Measures

The measures to evaluate the electronic preparedness may vary from country to country or even depending on the level of analysis to which one is interested (micro, meso or macro) considering not only the need to recognize the electronic preparedness of the country but also some specific environments/areas. 
The common factors that are taken into consideration for measuring e-readiness of a country are:

 Information and communications technology (ICT) infrastructure.
 Degree of preparedness of a country's government, citizens, businesses and NGOs to use ICT for sustainable development.
Digital economy rankings

Limitations
 Each of the most widely used e-readiness tools has its own set of measurement criteria and thus a study model needs to be re-designed to be assessed by a certain tool.
 Most e-readiness tools have limitations in terms of flexibility and applicability.
 There is no standardization of measures of the widely existed e-readiness tools.

See also 
 e-Government
 ICT Development Index

References 

IT infrastructure